Lost Worlds is a collection of fantasy short stories edited by American writer Lin Carter. It was first published in paperback by DAW Books in 1980. It was later reissued in hardcover and paperback by Wildside Press in May 2008, and in ebook by Gateway/Orion in May 2020.

Summary
The book collects eight stories by Carter, three of them collaborative, on the subject of such "lost worlds" as Atlantis, Mu, Valusia, and other "sunken continents beyond memory," together with an introduction and afterword by the author.

Contents
"Lost Worlds of Time" (introduction)
"The Scroll of Morloc" (with Clark Ashton Smith)
"The Stairs in the Crypt" (with Clark Ashton Smith)
"The Thing in the Pit"
"Thieves of Zangabal"
"Keeper of the Emerald Flame"
"Riders Beyond the Sunrise" (with Robert E. Howard)
"The Twelve Wizards of Ong"
"The Seal of Zaon Sathla"
"Lost Worlds to Come" (afterword)

Reception
The book was reviewed by Mark Willard in Science Fiction Review, Spring 1983.

Notes

1980 short story collections
Fantasy short story collections
Short story collections by Lin Carter
DAW Books books
American short story collections